Kaali – Ek Agnipariksha is an Indian crime thriller series that aired on Star Plus from 13 September 2010 to 18 March 2011. The series is inspired from Ruchika Girhotra case.

Synopsis
This is the tale narrated by Mrinal Kulkarni of the Mehta family who are simple and middle class with middle class values and dreams composed of Veerender Mehta and his two children 16-year-old Rachna and 11-year-old Rahul. Rachana is a girl with big dreams who is sure to make a mark in Badminton one day. Rachana's cousin, Anu is her best friend. Rachana is all through encouraged in her pursuit of playing Badminton by her family. And it's during this pursuit that the menacing bahubali of her town- Thakral, lays his eyes on her. It is from here on the journey of Rachana who decides to fight back against the big and mighty Thakral. Anu stands by Rachana and they remain deeply connected through the terror and trauma that Thakral unleashes on Rachana and her family. The story is the tale of Rachana who belongs to a small, peaceful and happy family and what happens to her and her family when disaster strikes in the form of a monster of a man called Thakral the Bahubali of Ghaziabad.

Cast

 Ashutosh Rana as Keshav Thakral
 Swati Kapoor as Rachana. The character was inspired by Ruchika, an Indian badminton player.
 Nia Sharma as Anu, Rachna's cousin and her best-friend
 Varun Jain as Arjun
 Arif Zakaria as Virendra ( Rachana's father)
 Perin Malde as Rahul (Rachana's brother)
 Vipra Rawal as Rajni
 Pranitaa Pandit as Janvi Thakral (Keshav Thakral's daughter)
 Akshay Anand as Amar
 Dimple Inamdar as Rajshree
 Neelu Kohli as Babli
 Mrinal Kulkarni as Sushma Rai / Aditi Chaudhary
 Anuj Thakur as Mohit
 Aham Sharma as Aditya Ahlawat
 Sonali Kulkarni as Narrator
 Aarun Nagar as Birju
 Dinesh Sharma as Siddharth

References

Indian television soap operas
StarPlus original programming
2010 Indian television series debuts
2011 Indian television series endings
Fictional portrayals of police departments in India
Indian crime television series